Actinodaphne salicina is a species of plant in the family Lauraceae. It is endemic to India, specifically Kerala and Tamil Nadu. Only two specimens of the plant have ever been found.

References

salicina
Flora of Tamil Nadu
Flora of Kerala
Endangered plants
Taxonomy articles created by Polbot